This list of museums in Oxfordshire, England contains museums which are defined for this context as institutions (including nonprofit organizations, government entities, and private businesses) that collect and care for objects of cultural, artistic, scientific, or historical interest and make their collections or related exhibits available for public viewing. Also included are non-profit art galleries and university art galleries with permanent collections. Museums that exist only in cyberspace (i.e., virtual museums) are not included.

Museums

Defunct museums
 Bygones Museum, Claydon

See also
 :Category:Tourist attractions in Oxfordshire
 List of museums in Oxford
 Oxfordshire Museums Council
 Virtual Library museums pages, started at Oxford University

References

External links

 Visit Britain: Oxfordshire Museums 
 Visit Southeast England
 Oxfordshire Museums Council: Museums

Oxfordshire
Lists of buildings and structures in Oxfordshire